The 1892 United States presidential election in West Virginia took place on November 8, 1892. All contemporary 44 states were part of the 1892 United States presidential election. West Virginia voters chose six electors to the Electoral College, which selected the president and vice president.

West Virginia was won by the Democratic nominees, former President Grover Cleveland of New York and his running mate Adlai Stevenson I of Illinois. This would prove the last occasion West Virginia voted Democratic in a presidential election until 1912.

Results

Results by county

Notes

References

West Virginia
1892
1892 West Virginia elections